Oaklands is a southern suburb of Christchurch, New Zealand. The area is predominantly residential. 

When Halswell House was purchased by Peter Watson (1869?–1947), he renamed it Oaklands after the trees lining the driveway. A subsequent owner, Karl Scott (1910–1997) subdivided the property about 1960.

Demographics

Oaklands had a population of 5,856 at the 2018 New Zealand census, an increase of 177 people (3.1%) since the 2013 census, and an increase of 147 people (2.6%) since the 2006 census. There were 2,121 households. There were 2,877 males and 2,976 females, giving a sex ratio of 0.97 males per female, with 1,122 people (19.2%) aged under 15 years, 1,161 (19.8%) aged 15 to 29, 2,631 (44.9%) aged 30 to 64, and 936 (16.0%) aged 65 or older.

Ethnicities were 84.4% European/Pākehā, 9.1% Māori, 2.4% Pacific peoples, 11.0% Asian, and 2.4% other ethnicities (totals add to more than 100% since people could identify with multiple ethnicities).

The proportion of people born overseas was 20.6%, compared with 27.1% nationally.

Although some people objected to giving their religion, 51.6% had no religion, 36.9% were Christian, 1.2% were Hindu, 0.4% were Muslim, 0.4% were Buddhist and 2.1% had other religions.

Of those at least 15 years old, 999 (21.1%) people had a bachelor or higher degree, and 858 (18.1%) people had no formal qualifications. The employment status of those at least 15 was that 2,568 (54.2%) people were employed full-time, 660 (13.9%) were part-time, and 153 (3.2%) were unemployed.

Education
Oaklands School Te Kura o Ōwaka is a full primary school catering for years 1 to 8.

References

Suburbs of Christchurch